Carter Creek may refer to:

Carter Creek (Current River), a stream in Missouri
Carter Creek (Meramec River), a stream in Missouri
Irvington, Virginia, a town once known as "Carter's Creek Wharf" after a tributary of the Rappahannock River

See also
Carters Creek, a stream in Tennessee